Chelidonium majus, the greater celandine, is a perennial herbaceous flowering plant in the poppy family Papaveraceae. One of two species in the genus Chelidonium, it is native to Europe and western Asia and introduced widely in North America.

The plant known as lesser celandine (Ficaria verna) is not closely related, as it belongs to the buttercup family Ranunculaceae.

Description
When injured, the plant exudes a yellow to orange latex.

A double-flowered variety occurs naturally. The flowers appear from late spring to summer, May to September (in the UK), in umbelliform cymes of about 4 flowers.

The seeds are small and black, borne in a long, cylindrical capsule. Each has an elaiosome, which attracts ants to disperse the seeds (myrmecochory).

Taxonomy and naming
The greater celandine is one of the many species described by the father of taxonomy, Carl Linnaeus, in volume one of his Species Plantarum in 1753.

Ancient writers said that the flower bloomed when the swallows returned and faded when they left. Chelidonium majus has also been called great celandine,, nipplewort, tetterwort, or simply "celandine". The common name tetterwort also refers to Sanguinaria canadensis.

In Devon it is also known as St John's wort.

Distribution and habitat
Chelidonium majus is native in most regions of Europe. It is also found in North Africa in Macaronesia, Algeria and Morocco. In Western Asia it is found in the Caucasus, Armenia, Azerbaijan, Georgia, Kazakhstan, Mongolia, Siberia, Iran and Turkey.

Ecology
It is considered an aggressive invasive plant in parts of North America, and an invasive plant in other areas. In Wisconsin, for example, it is a restricted plant. Control is obtained mainly via pulling or spraying the plant before seed dispersal.

Constituents and pharmacology

The whole plant is toxic in moderate doses as it contains a range of isoquinoline alkaloids; use in herbal medicine requires the correct dose. The main alkaloid present in the herb and root is coptisine. Other alkaloids present include methyl 2'-(7,8-dihydrosanguinarine-8-yl)acetate, allocryptopine, stylopine, protopine, norchelidonine, berberine, chelidonine, sanguinarine, chelerythrine, and 8-hydroxydihydrosanguinarine. Caffeic acid derivatives, such as caffeoylmalic acid, are also present.

The characteristic latex also contains proteolytic enzymes and the phytocystatin chelidostatin, a cysteine protease inhibitor. It is a traditional folk remedy against warts in France and the UK. It is used in the preparation of a range of off-the-shelf treatments for warts and skin conditions.

Chelidonium is used to make Ukrain, a drug that has been promoted for, but is not known to be effective for, the treatment of cancer and viral infections.

The fresh herb is no longer used officially. No dose-finding studies exist and the reported clinical studies are characterised by a considerable heterogeneity.

Except for homeopathic medicines, the drug is no longer used in most English-speaking countries. In Germany and Switzerland, extracts of Chelidoni herba are a controversial component of the gastric remedy "Iberogast". The OTC-preparation is a top-selling product for the company Bayer, which is now under investigation for not warning consumers from possible hepatotoxic side-effects when taking the drug. Elevated liver-enzymes and toxic hepatitis with a documented fatality have been reported.

The plant is poisonous to chickens.

Herbalism
The aerial parts and roots of greater celandine are used in herbalism. The above-ground parts are gathered during the flowering season and dried at high temperatures. The root is harvested in autumn between August and October and dried. The fresh rhizome is also used. Celandine has a hot and bitter taste. Preparations are made from alcoholic and hot aqueous extractions (tea). The related plant bloodroot has similar chemical composition and uses as greater celandine.

As far back as Pliny the Elder and Dioscorides (1st century CE) this herb has been recognized as a useful detoxifying agent. The root has been chewed to relieve toothache. John Gerard's Herball (1597) states that "the juice of the herbe is good to sharpen the sight, for it cleanseth and consumeth away slimie things that cleave about the ball of the eye and hinder the sight and especially being boiled with honey in a brasen vessell."

It was formerly used by some Romani people as a foot refresher; modern herbalists use its purgative properties.
The modern herbalist Juliette de Baïracli Levy recommended greater celandine diluted with milk for the eyes and the latex for getting rid of warts. Chelidonium was a favourite herb of the French herbalist Maurice Mességué.
Chelidonium majus has traditionally been used for treatment of various inflammatory diseases including atopic dermatitis. It is also traditionally used in the treatment of gallstones and dyspepsia.

The Iroquois give an infusion of whole plant, another plant and milk to pigs that drool and have sudden movements.

It was also once used to treat liver disorders, owing to the juice's resemblance to bile.

Gallery

References

Papaveroideae
Flora of Europe
Flora of Africa
Flora of Asia
Medicinal plants of Asia
Medicinal plants of Europe
Plants used in traditional Native American medicine
Taxa named by Joseph Pitton de Tournefort